Croatia participated in the Eurovision Song Contest 2016 with the song "Lighthouse" written by Andreas Grass and Nikola Paryla. The song was performed by Nina Kraljić. Croatia returned to the Eurovision Song Contest after a two-year absence following their withdrawal in  due to financial limitations and poor results at the contest. Nina Kraljić was selected internally by the Croatian broadcaster Croatian Radiotelevision (HRT) on 24 February 2016 to represent Croatia at the 2016 contest in Stockholm, Sweden. Her song "Lighthouse" was presented to the public on 9 March 2016 during a special radio programme broadcast on the HR 2 station.

Croatia was drawn to compete in the first semi-final of the Eurovision Song Contest which took place on 10 May 2016. Performing during the show in position 5, "Lighthouse" was announced among the top 10 entries of the first semi-final and therefore qualified to compete in the final on 14 May. This was Croatia's first qualification to the final in seven years; their last appearance in the final was in 2009. It was later revealed that Croatia placed tenth out of the 18 participating countries in the semi-final with 133 points. In the final, Croatia performed in position 17 and placed twenty-third out of the 26 participating countries, scoring 73 points.

Background 

The nation's best result in the contest was fourth, which it achieved on two occasions: in 1996 with the song "Sveta ljubav" performed by Maja Blagdan and in 1999 with the song "Marija Magdalena" performed by Doris Dragović. Between 2010 and 2013, the Croatian entries failed to qualify from the semi-finals; the last time Croatia competed in the final was in 2009 with the song "Lijepa Tena" performed by Igor Cukrov featuring Andrea. In 2013, Croatia failed to qualify to the final with Klapa s Mora and the song "Mižerja".

The Croatian national broadcaster, Croatian Radiotelevision (HRT), broadcasts the event within Croatia and organises the selection process for the nation's entry. Between 1993 and 2011, HRT organised the national final Dora in order to select the Croatian entry for the Eurovision Song Contest. In 2012 and 2013, the broadcaster opted to internally select the entry. After consistently being present for every contest since their debut in 1993, the Croatian broadcaster announced in September 2013 that the country would not participate in the  citing the European financial crisis and a string of poor results at the contest as reasons for their decision. Following their two-year absence, HRT confirmed Croatia's participation in the 2016 Eurovision Song Contest on 26 November 2015 and continued the internal selection procedure.

Before Eurovision

Internal selection
On 24 February 2016, the Croatian national broadcaster HRT announced that it had internally selected Nina Kraljić to represent Croatia at the Eurovision Song Contest 2016. Previously, Croatian media reported between May and June 2015 that if Croatia returned to the contest, HRT would likely select the winner of the reality singing competition The Voice – Najljepši glas Hrvatske, Nina Kraljić, to represent the nation.

The song that Kraljić performed at the Eurovision Song Contest, "Lighthouse", was presented on 9 March 2016 during a special radio programme broadcast on HR 2 and hosted by Zlatko Turkalj Turki. Nina Kraljić, the Croatian Eurovision Song Contest Head of Delegation Željko Mesar and Universal Music Croatia marketing manager Nina Meden were guests during the presentation show. The song was written by the Austrian songwriting team Popmaché, consisting of Andreas Grass and Nikola Paryla, and produced by Thorsten Brötzmann in Germany. In regards to her song, Kraljić stated: "It has been an exceptional honour for me to work with such a talented and experienced team. The song has a brilliant message of hope, which, without looking at all the mischiefs in life, is always present and shining".

Preparation
On 21 March, the preview video submitted for the Eurovision Song Contest by HRT for "Lighthouse" premiered, which featured a compilation of video segments from the short film Hvar Into the Storm, filmed by Mario Romulić and Dražen Stojčić. In late March and early April, Kraljić filmed the music video for "Lighthouse", which was directed by Filip Filković Philatz and the company Antitalent Production. The music video was released to the public on 7 April.

Promotion
Nina Kraljić made several appearances across Europe to specifically promote "Lighthouse" as the Croatian Eurovision entry. At the end of March 2016, Nina Kraljić completed a 48-hour tour of Serbia where she gave several interviews about her Eurovision participation to media outlets from Radio Television of Serbia (RTS), RTV Pink, N1 Studios and MTV Adria; Kraljić also performed "Lighthouse" live for the first time during the RTS morning programme. On 9 April, Kraljić performed during the Eurovision in Concert event which was held at the Melkweg venue in Amsterdam, Netherlands and hosted by Cornald Maas and Hera Björk. On 17 April, Kraljić performed during the London Eurovision Party, which was held at the Café de Paris venue in London, United Kingdom and hosted by Nicki French and Paddy O'Connell.

In addition to her international appearances, Nina Kraljić performed "Lighthouse" as a musical guest during the 2016 Miss Universe Croatia pageant in Zagreb on 15 April and she also performed the song as a guest during the HRT 1 programme The Voice – Najljepši glas Hrvatske on 16 April. On 27 April, Kraljić held a concert together with Jacques Houdek at the Vatroslav Lisinski Concert Hall in Zagreb.

At Eurovision 

According to Eurovision rules, all nations with the exceptions of the host country and the "Big Five" (France, Germany, Italy, Spain and the United Kingdom) are required to qualify from one of two semi-finals in order to compete for the final; the top ten countries from each semi-final progress to the final. The European Broadcasting Union (EBU) split up the competing countries into six different pots based on voting patterns from previous contests, with countries with favourable voting histories put into the same pot. On 25 January 2016, a special allocation draw was held which placed each country into one of the two semi-finals, as well as which half of the show they would perform in. Croatia was placed into the first semi-final, to be held on 10 May 2016, and was scheduled to perform in the first half of the show.

Once all the competing songs for the 2016 contest had been released, the running order for the semi-finals was decided by the shows' producers rather than through another draw, so that similar songs were not placed next to each other. Croatia was set to perform in position 5, following the entry from Hungary and before the entry from the Netherlands.

The two semi-finals and the final were broadcast in Croatia on HRT 1 with commentary by Duško Ćurlić. The three shows were also broadcast via radio on HR 2 with commentary by Zlatko Turkalj Turki. The Croatian spokesperson, who announced the top 12-point score awarded by the Croatian jury during the final, was Nevena Rendeli.

Semi-final

Nina Kraljić took part in technical rehearsals on 2 and 6 May, followed by dress rehearsals on 9 and 10 May. This included the jury show on 9 May where the professional juries of each country watched and voted on the competing entries.

The Croatian performance featured Nina Kraljić dressed in a large black-patterned grey coat, which was removed to reveal a white dress with blue and metallic elements. Kraljić's outfit was designed by Juraj Zigman with shoes designed by Ivan Ledenko. The stage lighting transitioned from blue to red as the performance progressed with the LED screens projecting sea waves and starry skies. Kraljić was joined on stage by four backing vocalists dressed in black coats: Andrej Babić, Martina Majerle, Danijela Večerinović and Lino Lacmanović Ćućić. Majerle previously represented Slovenia in the Eurovision Song Contest 2009 together with the group Quartissimo where they failed to qualify to the grand final of the contest with the song "Love Symphony".

At the end of the show, Croatia was announced as having finished in the top 10 and subsequently qualifying for the grand final. This was Croatia's first qualification to the final in seven years; their last appearance in the final was in 2009. It was later revealed that Croatia placed tenth in the semi-final, receiving a total of 133 points: 53 points from the televoting and 80 points from the juries.

Final
Shortly after the first semi-final, a winners' press conference was held for the ten qualifying countries. As part of this press conference, the qualifying artists took part in a draw to determine which half of the grand final they would subsequently participate in. This draw was done in the order the countries appeared in the semi-final running order. Croatia was drawn to compete in the second half. Following this draw, the shows' producers decided upon the running order of the final, as they had done for the semi-finals. Croatia was subsequently placed to perform in position 17, following the entry from Lithuania and before the entry from Russia.

Nina Kraljić once again took part in dress rehearsals on 13 and 14 May before the final, including the jury final where the professional juries cast their final votes before the live show. Nina Kraljić performed a repeat of her semi-final performance during the final on 14 May. Croatia placed twenty-third in the final, scoring 73 points: 33 points from the televoting and 40 points from the juries.

Voting
Voting during the three shows was conducted under a new system that involved each country now awarding two sets of points from 1-8, 10 and 12: one from their professional jury and the other from televoting. Each nation's jury consisted of five music industry professionals who are citizens of the country they represent, with their names published before the contest to ensure transparency. This jury judged each entry based on: vocal capacity; the stage performance; the song's composition and originality; and the overall impression by the act. In addition, no member of a national jury was permitted to be related in any way to any of the competing acts in such a way that they cannot vote impartially and independently. The individual rankings of each jury member as well as the nation's televoting results were released shortly after the grand final.

Below is a breakdown of points awarded to Croatia and awarded by Croatia in the first semi-final and grand final of the contest, and the breakdown of the jury voting and televoting conducted during the two shows:

Points awarded to Croatia

Points awarded by Croatia

Detailed voting results
The following members comprised the Croatian jury:
 Duško Mandić (jury chairperson)music producer
 Boris Đurđevićmusic producer
 Damir Kedžosinger, later selected to represent Croatia in the cancelled 2020 contest
 Pamela Ramljaksinger, represented Bosnia and Herzegovina in the 2005 contest and Croatia in the 2010 contest as member of Feminnem
 Kim Versonsinger

References

External links 

Official HRT Eurovision site

2016
Countries in the Eurovision Song Contest 2016
Eurovision